The Boothill Cemetery (also known as Coulson Cemetery) is a historic cemetery in Billings, Montana. It was the burial ground for the ghost town of Coulson. It was acquired by the city of Billings in the 1920s, and a steel entrance sign was installed in 1970. One of the most notable burials is H. M. "Muggins" Taylor, a deputy sheriff who warned the people of Bozeman about the Battle of the Little Bighorn. It has been listed on the National Register of Historic Places since April 17, 1979.

References

External links
 
 

Buildings and structures in Billings, Montana
Cemeteries on the National Register of Historic Places in Montana
National Register of Historic Places in Yellowstone County, Montana
Cemeteries in Montana
Boot Hill cemeteries